Arenas is a corregimiento in Mariato District, Veraguas Province, Panama with a population of 663 as of 2010. Its population as of 1990 was 1,459; its population as of 2000 was 1,163.

References

Corregimientos of Veraguas Province